The Lahore Eagles was a Faysal Bank T20 Cup team, based in Lahore, Punjab, Pakistan. The team was established in 2006 and its home ground was Gaddafi Stadium.

See also
 Pakistan Super League

References

External links
Twenty 20 Record page for Lahore Eagles
Cricketarchive page for Lahore Eagles

Cricket clubs established in 2006
2006 establishments in Pakistan
Cricket teams in Pakistan
Eagles